Alexander Silcock Scott (22 November 1936 – 13 September 2001) was a Scottish footballer who played as a right winger.

Club career
Born in Falkirk, Scott started his senior career at Rangers, whom he joined aged 16 in 1954 from Bo'ness United. He scored a hat-trick in his debut against Falkirk at Ibrox while just 19 years old. In nine years with the club he scored 108 goals in 331 matches and won four league titles, one Scottish Cup and two League Cups. He was also part of the Rangers side defeated by Fiorentina in the 1961 UEFA Cup Winners' Cup Final, scoring the Gers' only goal. With Rangers signing Willie Henderson, he moved to Everton in February 1963 for £39,000 and helped them win the Division One title two months later and then the 1963 FA Charity Shield. He also won the FA Cup with the Toffees in 1966.

Scott returned to Scotland when signed by Hibernian for £13,000 in 1967 and finished his career at his hometown club Falkirk between 1970 and 1972. Curiously, Hibernian used part of the fee they received from Newcastle United for the transfer of Alex's younger brother Jim to finance his signature. The brothers did play together at Falkirk, however, Jim joining several months before Alex's retirement in 1972.

Scott went into business with his brother after his retirement from football. He died in Falkirk in 2001, aged 64.

International career
Scott won 16 caps for Scotland between 1956 and 1966 and was a member of their 1958 FIFA World Cup squad. He also represented his country at B and under-23 level, as well as appearing seven times for the Scottish League.

See also
 List of Scotland national football team hat-tricks

References

External links

1936 births
2001 deaths
Footballers from Falkirk
Association football wingers
Scottish footballers
Scotland international footballers
Scotland B international footballers
1958 FIFA World Cup players
Rangers F.C. players
Everton F.C. players
Hibernian F.C. players
Falkirk F.C. players
Scottish Football League players
English Football League players
Bo'ness United F.C. players
Scottish Football League representative players
Scotland under-23 international footballers
Scottish Junior Football Association players
Scotland junior international footballers
FA Cup Final players